"Love House" is a song by English singer Samantha Fox from her third studio album, I Wanna Have Some Fun (1988). Rob Bolland and Ferdi Bolland wrote and produced the song. It was released as the first European single from the album in the third quarter of 1988. In the United States, it was released as the album's third and final single in 1989.

Song information
"Love House" was one of the first acid house singles to appear on mainstream charts. In 2009, reflecting on the rave era, Fox stated, "Of course, I experienced the acid house scene. It actually happened in London at the end of the 80's and acid house parties were held in disused warehouses that were taken over for one night only."

Among the samples used is a vocable from "Just That Type of Girl" by Madame X and "Yamsaharny" by legendary singer Umm Kulthum. The "Black Pyramid Mix" was produced by electronic music producer Kevin Saunderson.

Reception
The Orlando Sentinel praised the song saying, "Rob and Ferdi Bolland twiddle the knobs to grand effect on 'Love House' and also on 'One in a Million'." The Dallas Morning News, however, dismissed the track as "computerized schlock" and "pseudofunk."

The single peaked at number 32 on the UK Singles Chart. In the United States, it failed to reach the Billboard Hot 100. However, it reached number 14 on Billboards Hot Dance Club Play chart.

Music video
The single's music video was avant-garde in concept, with Fox shown in various outfits including a kimono and a sari. Fox's exuberant performance is contrasted with eerie characters and effects, creating a sense of foreboding.

Track listings
7-inch single
A. "Love House" – 3:35
B. "Don't Cheat on Me" – 3:03

UK 12-inch single
A. "Love House" (The Black Pyramid mix) – 6:40
B1. "Love House" (Sulphuric mix) – 7:40
B2. "Don't Cheat on Me" – 3:03

US 12-inch single
A1. "Love House" (The Black Pyramid mix) – 6:40
A2. "Love House" (DJ Pierre Club mix) – 5:59
A3. "Love House" (7″ edit) – 3:35
B1. "Love House" (Coldest mix) – 6:15
B2. "Love House" (7″ remix) – 4:00
B3. "Love House" (The Chicago House Jam mix) – 6:00
B4. "Don't Cheat on Me" – 3:03

Charts

References

1988 singles
Jive Records singles
Samantha Fox songs
Songs written by Ferdi Bolland
Songs written by Rob Bolland
1988 songs